There are 72 counties in the U.S. State of Wisconsin. The land that eventually became Wisconsin was transferred from British to American control with the 1783 signing of the Treaty of Paris. It was an unorganized part of the Northwest Territory until 1802 when all of the land from St. Louis north to the Canadian border was organized as St. Clair County.  When Illinois was admitted to the union in 1818, Wisconsin became part of the Territory of Michigan and divided into two counties: Brown County in the northeast along Lake Michigan and Crawford County in the southwest along the Mississippi River. Iowa County was formed in 1829 from the Crawford County land south of the Wisconsin River. Brown County's southern portion was used to form Milwaukee County in 1834. The state of Wisconsin was created from Wisconsin Territory on May 29, 1848, with 28 counties.

The most populous county in the state is Milwaukee County at 928,059 people at the 2021 Census estimate. Its population is bolstered by the city of Milwaukee's 577,222 people. The county with the least population is Menominee County with 4,289 residents; the Menominee Indian Reservation is co-extensive with the county.

The Federal Information Processing Standard (FIPS) code, which is used by the United States government to uniquely identify states and counties, is provided with each entry. Wisconsin's code is 55, which when combined with any county code would be written as 55XXX. The FIPS code for each county links to census data for that county.

Governance 
Each county has a county seat, often a populous or centrally located community, where the county's governmental offices are located. Some of the services provided by the county include: law enforcement, circuit courts, social services, vital records and deed registration, road maintenance, and snow removal. County officials include sheriffs, district attorneys, clerks, treasurers, coroners, surveyors, registers of deeds, and clerks of circuit court; these officers are elected for four-year terms. In most counties, elected coroners have been replaced by appointed medical examiners. State law permits counties to appoint a registered land surveyor in place of electing a surveyor.

Counties in Wisconsin are governed by county boards, headed by a chairperson. Counties with a population of 500,000 or more must also have a county executive.  Smaller counties may have either a county executive or a county administrator. As of 2011, 13 counties had elected county executives: Brown, Chippewa, Dane, Fond du Lac, Kenosha, Manitowoc, Milwaukee, Outagamie, Portage, Racine, Sawyer, Waukesha, and Winnebago. 23 had an appointed county administrator, 34 had an appointed administrative coordinator, and 2 had neither an executive nor an administrator. Waukesha County had both an executive and an administrator.

List of counties

|}

Renamed counties
Five counties in Wisconsin have been renamed, but otherwise kept their same borders.

 Bad Axe County existed from 1851 to 1862. It was named after the Bad Axe River and the Battle of Bad Axe. It was renamed to Vernon County in 1862.
 Dallas County existed for 10 years, from 1859 to 1869. It was named after George M. Dallas, the 11th vice president of the United States. It was named to Barron County in 1869.
 Gates County existed from 1901 to 1905. It was named after Milwaukee land speculator James L. Gates. It was renamed to Rusk County in 1905. 
 La Pointe County existed from 1845 to 1866. In 1848, when Wisconsin achieved statehood, La Pointe County was split between Wisconsin and Minnesota. It was renamed to Bayfield County in 1866.
 New County existed briefly between 1879 and 1880. It was formed from part of Oconto County. It was renamed to Langlade County in 1880.

Proposed counties 
Two counties have been proposed, but none were established.

 Tuskola County was proposed in 1850, which would be split off of Washington County. The proposed borders lie within the modern Washington and Ozaukee counties. 
 Century County was proposed in 1997 for creation after the year 2000, to be created out of Wood, Clark, and Marathon counties and centered around the city of Marshfield. The name was selected to represent "a new county for a new century.".

See also
Political subdivisions of Wisconsin
List of cities in Wisconsin
List of villages in Wisconsin
List of towns in Wisconsin

References

External links
Wisconsin historical county boundaries map from Atlas of Historical County Boundaries at Newberry Library website

Wisconsin, counties in
 
Counties